Viktor Bobrov (born January 1, 1984) is a Russian ice hockey player. He is currently playing an unrestricted free agent who most recently played with HC Spartak Moscow of the Kontinental Hockey League (KHL). He was selected by Calgary Flames in the 5th round (146th overall) of the 2002 NHL Entry Draft.

Career statistics

External links

1984 births
Living people
Atlant Moscow Oblast players
People from Novocheboksarsk
Calgary Flames draft picks
HC Vityaz players
Russian ice hockey forwards
HC Khimik Voskresensk players
HC Sibir Novosibirsk players
HC Spartak Moscow players
Sportspeople from Chuvashia